The 2008–09 CEV Challenge Cup was the 29th edition of the European Challenge Cup volleyball club tournament, the former CEV Cup.

The Turkish club Arkas İzmir beat Polish club Jastrzębski Węgiel in the final and achieved its first CEV Challenge Cup trophy.

Final Four
Venue: Karşıyaka Arena,  İzmir

Semifinals

|}

3rd place

|}

Final

|}

Final standing

Awards

Most Valuable Player
  Paul Duerden (Arkas İzmir)
Best Scorer
  Ashley Nemer (Tomis Constanța)
Best Opposite
  Gökhan Öner (Arkas İzmir)
Best Blocker
  Radu Began (Tomis Constanța) 

Best Server
  Gökhan Öner (Arkas İzmir)
Best Receiver
  Paweł Rusek (Jastrzębski Węgiel)
Best Setter
  Hüseyin Koç (Arkas İzmir)

References

External links
 Official site

CEV Challenge Cup
2008 in volleyball
2009 in volleyball